The Viaduct Tavern is a Grade II listed public house at 126 Newgate Street, Holborn, London. It was built in 1865 and the interior was remodelled in 1898–1900 by Arthur Dixon. It is on the Campaign for Real Ale's National Inventory of Historic Pub Interiors.

The tavern is also known for reportedly being haunted, and has been the subject of several investigation shows, including BuzzFeed Unsolved.

References

External links
 

Grade II listed pubs in the City of London
National Inventory Pubs
Buildings and structures in Holborn
Fuller's pubs